Auzella Savage (1846 – 1882) was a sailor in the U.S. Navy stationed aboard the  during the American Civil War. He received the Medal of Honor for his actions during the Second Battle of Fort Fisher on January 15, 1865.

Military service
Savage volunteered for service in the U.S. Navy and was assigned to the Union brig . His enlistment is credited to the state of Massachusetts.

On January 15, 1865, the North Carolina Confederate stronghold of Fort Fisher was taken by a combined Union storming party of sailors, marines, and soldiers under the command of Admiral David Dixon Porter and General Alfred Terry. Savage was a member of the storming party.

Medal of Honor citation
The President of the United States of America, in the name of Congress, takes pleasure in presenting the Medal of Honor to Ordinary Seaman Auzella Savage, United States Navy, for extraordinary heroism in action while serving on board the U.S.S. Santiago de Cuba in the assault on Fort Fisher, North Carolina, 15 January 1865. When the landing party to which he was attached charged on the fort with a cheer, and the determination to plant the colors on the ramparts, Ordinary Seaman Savage remained steadfast when more than two-thirds of the marines and sailors fell back in panic during the fight. When enemy fire shot away the flagstaff above his hand, he bravely seized the remainder of the staff and brought his colors safely off.

General Orders: War Department, General Orders No. 59 (June 22, 1865)

Action Date: January 15, 1865

Service: Navy

Rank: Ordinary Seaman

Division: U.S.S. Santiago de Cuba

See also

List of Medal of Honor recipients
List of American Civil War Medal of Honor recipients: Q–S

References

1846 births
1882 deaths
People from Anson, Maine
Union Navy sailors
United States Navy Medal of Honor recipients
American Civil War recipients of the Medal of Honor